Communities for a Better Environment (CBE), previously known as Citizens for a Better Environment, is a policy-focused non-profit organization started in 1971 by Marc Anderson and David Come in Chicago, Illinois. In the late 1970s and early 1980s, CBE expanded to California, Wisconsin, and Minnesota. Today, CBE is active primarily in California having established itself in San Francisco in 1978 and expanded to Los Angeles in 1982. CBE, now based in Oakland, CA, and Huntington Park, CA, has affected communities throughout California, including Richmond, East Oakland, Vernon, Huntington Park, Boyle Heights, Pacoima, Wilmington, and SE Los Angeles. CBE was the first environmental organization to practice door-to-door canvassing by directly involving community members. In 1980, CBE won the United States Supreme Court decision on Village of Schaumburg v. Citizens for a Better Environment 444 U.S. 620 protecting the 1st and 14th Amendment Rights of door-to-door activists with CBE and countless other public interest organizations. CBE's early combination of grassroots organizing with research and legal work provided the innovative edge needed to challenge large-scale industries, refineries, and policies.

About
CBE focuses on urban areas which maintain a disproportionate concentration of low-income communities with poor environmental health conditions due to heavy pollution from refineries, ports, power plants, freeways, etc. These communities are more susceptible to cancer and diseases including asthma, heart disease, premature deaths, birth defects, etc. CBE values environmental and social sustainability as an intrinsic right for all humans to access clean air and drinking water regardless of race, gender, sexual orientation, age, culture, ability, nationality, or income.

Early work
CBE began by advocating for community concerns and environmental regulation regarding water, air, and toxic pollution. In 1977, CBE organized with community members against the Diablo Canyon Power Plant in San Francisco, California.  In 1983, landmark report and investigation of Bay Area toxic secretion, "Toxics in the Bay", held Chevron and others accountable for toxic discharge in the 1985 Basin Plan Discharge Program. The Basin Plan expanded to become the San Francisco Bay Region Basin Plan in 2004. The plan complied with California State and Federal anti-degradation policies awaiting approval by San Francisco State Water Board and the US Environmental Protection Agency. CBE pressured Bay Area Quality Management District to reevaluate permit granted to Kaiser Cement and Gypsum Corporation resulting in sulfur dioxide reduction by 50% and limiting use of perchloroethylene, aka Tetrachloroethylene, in Vallejo, California, in dry-cleaning.

Research approach
Several studies support the idea that low-income communities of color bear the burden of unequal access to a healthy environment, which prioritizes CBE's effort to work with communities to fight such injustices.
CBE focuses on educating low-income communities of color and advocating engagement via community meetings, political education, and school groups, where people are empowered to fight local pollution by working together toward achieving healthier communities. CBE also values scientific research to fully comprehend the direct and indirect consequences of toxicity and chemical secretion. Using secondary data and partnering with health providers and academic institutions, CBE conducts research on human subjects and online training for human subject protection via the National Institute of Health website.

Case studies
1. Community-Based Participatory Research as a Tool for Policy Change: A Case Study of the Southern California Environmental Justice Collaborative.
CBE collaborated with Liberty Hill Foundation and an academic research team from University of California, Santa Cruz, Brown University, and Occidental College to have Rule 1402 reviewed. Rule 1402, included in the South Coast Air Quality Management District was the state's goal in 1994 to reduce public health risk from cancerous and noncancerous emissions by large industries. The maximum individual cancer risk was initially set at 100 cancer risks per million, yet due to CBE's collaboration, it was reduced to 25 cancer risks per million 6 years later, representing a reduction in acceptable risk levels to 75%. This collaboration led to more efforts in the reduction of allowable risk level faced by various communities and encouraged the California Environmental Protection Agency to broaden their view on issues such as these, to put more emphasis on risk exposure when making new policies.

2. Linking Exposure Assessment Science With Policy Objectives for Environmental Justice and Breast Cancer Advocacy: The Northern California Household Exposure Study. 
CBE's research contributed to an investigation of a high amount of pollutants increasing a woman's chance of getting cancer. In the United States, African American women have the highest rate of cancer and mortality than any other race.

Chevron Richmond refinery
CBE and two organizations conducted the research in the Richmond health survey and it showed that the chemical exposures in Richmond were extremely high.   When contrasted with Bolinas, as seen in the case study, Richmond's air pollution was far worse, and this could be due to the Chevron Refinery. Chevron is the largest employer in town but as CBE research has shown, compared with the statewide average for all business activity oil refining creates ten times fewer jobs.

In 2009, CBE and other local organizations filed a petition to have the Chevron Refinery's plan to expand looked at once more. Expanding its facility would have allowed them to process dirty crude oil, increasing greenhouse gases and toxic emissions to local communities.  The expansion was stopped because CBE argued that the Environmental Impact Statement violated the California Environmental Quality Act since it didn't take into consideration how this would increase the pollution in the city. 
Richmond came up with the General Plan 2030, and its goal is to become more sustainable and also develop healthy neighborhoods by 2030. As part of this plan, Richmond's Planning Commission supported CBE's campaign, Less Pollution, More Jobs in 2012. This campaign enforces regulation in facilities that emit toxic chemicals, and it would require them to use energy efficient equipment.

Southern California
CBE works with various southern California communities especially the most polluted in the country. The Los Angeles area, Riverside communities, San Bernardino, and Orange County were ranked the smoggiest area in the nation in 2012 when it comes to air pollution. CBE works with other cities in southern California like Wilmington, Huntington Park, and the various cities that surround the Interstate 710, to minimize the exposure from residents living near it. The Southern California offices are also well versed in community active with subgroups of youths joining CBE ranks to fight environmental injustice in their heavily impacted, people of color communities. Beginning in 1997, the sub-program  Youth for Environmental Justice has extended in numbers over the past few years, displaying influence in California's capitol, Sacramento; to providing support to at the grassroot march in Paris 2016.

Huntington Park
Huntington Park is near the Los Angeles area and air pollution is not the only environmental problem because it has a lot of “brownfields”, which are abandoned or unused land used for activities that may have left the land contaminated.  As of now the EPA is funding this project and the city of Huntington Park, CBE, and local residents have begun the transformation from brownfield areas into sustainable areas.

Wilmington Area
CBE and other community groups are working with the Wilmington/Carson area that is exposed to high amounts of local pollution. This exposure puts those communities at risk for various diseases, mainly cardiovascular and respiratory ones. These communities have proposed a policy, which is Clean up, Green Up, and hopes to reduce and prevent pollution throughout mainly affected communities. This policy hopes to create Green Zones in these communities where the shift to green, sustainable communities will be encouraged.
The Clean Up Green Up policy was approved in Los Angeles City Council in 2011, and since then CBE has been working alongside the community in order to make this policy provide stronger regulation to polluting facilities.

I-710
The Interstate 710 freeway is 23 miles long and it runs from the Long Beach port to the City of Alhambra. There has been planning to expand the I-710 in order to make it easier to transport to and from the port, but many oppose it because it will increase pollution leading to more exposure to the communities around it. CBE worked with other organizations to create the Community Alternative 7 plan, which calls for improvements to be made along the I-710 to minimize pollution.

Collaborations and coalitions
As an active statewide California environmental justice organization, CBE has built a number of strategic alliances over its 34 years of work to work with partners that share a common vision of building power in marginalized communities. They are one of many organizations that make up the California Environmental Justice Alliance (CEJA), which organize in communities affected by pollution, working towards getting better protection for their community and environment. Over 35 community-based organizations, including CBE, make up the Climate Justice Alliance (CJA) where they work towards the usage of sustainable energy in local communities. Grassroots Global Justice Alliance (GGJ), is made of various community groups including CBE, working with communities of color faced with the most environmental pollution and toxics. In regards to the expansion of the I-710, CBE and the Coalition for Environmental Health and Justice (CEHAJ) have worked together to create the Community Alternative 7 to improve the environmental conditions along I-710 corridor. CBE focuses on the people employed by toxic facilities and works with Don't Waste LA, in order to create a proposal for community protection to further exposure. This proposal would require them to reduce toxic waste.  Green LA Coalition, Communities for a Better Environment, and other environmental justice groups, are focusing on LA in order to minimize the communities’ exposure to pollutants. In the chevron case CBE  also worked alongside Asian Pacific Environmental Network to have Chevron's permit reviewed.  Local Clean Energy Alliance is made up of 70 organizations that call for renewable energy, pollutant reduction, and green jobs in California. It is also a member of the Bay Area Environmental Health Collaborative (BAEHC)  working towards the reduction of pollution in vulnerable low income communities of color. CBE and Ditching Dirty Diesel work to bring awareness and advocacy on the issue of health problems and diesel pollution correlation.  CBE also has a partnership with Richmond Equitable Development Initiative's to brainstorm activities which may increase the communities’ advocacy for a specific problem.  CBE has been a member of the Oakland Climate Action Coalition (OCAC), their efforts have allowed the inclusion of climate justice and health policies into the Oakland's Climate Action Plan.

CBE in the media
In recent media, Communities for a Better Environment is mentioned as being an expert in environmental issues advocating policy, organizational strategies, and seen on the forefronts of current issues and cases. CBE lawyer Shana Lazero, seen as an expert in power plants in low-income communities; CBE Attorney Maya Golden-Krasner, gives expertise on how agencies can help address needs of communities in toxic environments; Andres Soto, CBE organizer, expresses his discontent with the permit process of BAAQMD in local Bay Area newspaper and is featured in YouTube's News Channel, The Nation's moving eight-minute documentary about living in Richmond as living and breathing in the shadow of Chevron. The documentary also highlights injustices found in California Global Warming Solutions Act of 2006 (AB32) cap and trade policy also known as emission trading Internationally, CBE is mentioned in UK news outlet, The Guardian, as a key leader with Asian Pacific Environmental Network in fighting refinery and industry expansion.
Local news station KTVU illustrates the tension as Richmond Chevron Refinery plans to expand as one of the largest refineries in California. Chevron's representative, says the one billion dollar expansion project will not increase crude oil, emissions, pollutants, health risk, or greenhouse gases. CBE's Greg Karros advocates on behalf of the community's skepticism for an informed review before moving forward in expansion. CBE's opinion and expertise is often highlighted as dual representation experts in environmental fields and community members. CBE encourages community members to share their stories in the media and the general public so that their experiences can affect people within and from other communities.

Future
CBE expresses urgency to implement and influence environmental justice in California. They are also committed to global participation in addressing present and future environmental concerns. CBE Communications Coordinator, Steven Low, says the future of CBE will involve Urban Agriculture, Food Justice, and “Adaptation” as a response to Global Warming and Climate Change. CBE is sponsoring the Charge Ahead Campaign which will "help put one million electric cars, trucks and busses on California's roads, reducing air pollution, improving health and saving money". Charge Ahead is sponsored by several organizations and designated $200 million from the states cap and trade auctions, whereby CBE advocates for low income communities of color's access to zero emission transportation.

References 

Environmental justice organizations
Environmental organizations based in the San Francisco Bay Area
Non-profit organizations based in California
Richmond, California
1971 establishments in the United States